Rosie Nangala Fleming (born 1928) is a Warlpiri painter and sculptor.

Her work is included in the collections of the Seattle Art Museum, the National Gallery of Victoria and the Brighton and Hove Museums and Art Galleries.

In the 1970s she founded the Warlpiri Women's Museum.

References

External links

1928 births
Living people
20th-century Australian women artists
20th-century Australian artists
21st-century Australian women artists
21st-century Australian artists